Hamad Al-Eissa (born 1982) is a Saudi Arabian football (soccer) player who currently plays as a defender for Al Hazm.

External links
Saudi League Profile

1982 births
Living people
Saudi Arabian footballers
Ittihad FC players
Al-Shabab FC (Riyadh) players
Ettifaq FC players
Al-Hazem F.C. players
Al-Tai FC players
Saudi First Division League players
Saudi Professional League players
Association football defenders